Kazakhstan announced on 18 July 2019 that they would participate at the seventeenth Junior Eurovision Song Contest to be held in Gliwice, Poland. The Kazakh broadcaster, Khabar Agency (KA), was responsible for the country's participation in the contest.

Background

On 25 November 2017, Channel 31 of Kazakhstan revealed their intention to participate in the Junior Eurovision Song Contest 2018. Initial claims emerged on 22 December 2017 from both the Kazakh Minister of Culture and Sports, Arystanbek Mukhamediuly; and the Director General of Channel 31, Bagdat Kodzhahmetov; that Kazakhstan had applied to become a member of the EBU, with the hope of participating both in the Eurovision Song Contest and the Junior Eurovision Song Contest. Kodzhahmetov invited Daneliya Tuleshova, winner of the fourth season of Ukraine's version of The Voice Kids, to take part in the casting process to represent Kazakhstan in the Junior Eurovision Song Contest. The next day, however, the EBU made a statement the following day rejecting the possibility of Kazakhstan becoming an active member of the EBU, owing to the fact that Kazakhstan is neither within the European Broadcasting Area nor the Council of Europe.

Before Junior Eurovision
Channel 31 also stated its intention to broadcast the contests in 2018 and 2019. Khabar Agency has been an associate member of the European Broadcasting Union (EBU) since January 2016.

On 29 July 2019, Yerzhan Maksim was internally chosen to represent Kazakhstan in Gliwice.

Artist and song information

Yerzhan Maksim
Yerzhan Maksim (born 6 September 2007) is a Kazakh child singer, also known as Yerzhan Maxim. He represented Kazakhstan at the Junior Eurovision Song Contest 2019 in Gliwice, Poland, on 24 November 2019 with the song "Armanyńnan qalma".

Maksim was born in the city of Oral, West Kazakhstan Region, and was one of the winners of the sixth season of The Voice Kids Russia. He also performed the song "Elimdi súıemin", which competed in the Kazakhstani national selection for the Junior Eurovision Song Contest 2018, placing 2nd.

Armanyńnan qalma
"Armanyńnan qalma" or "Armanyñnan qalma" is a song by Kazakh singer Yerzhan Maksim. It is composed by Khamit Shangaliyev and written by Aldabergenov Daniyar and Timur Balymbetov.

It represented Kazakhstan at the Junior Eurovision Song Contest 2019 in Gliwice, Poland. The song came in 2nd place with 227 points.

At Junior Eurovision
During the opening ceremony and the running order draw which both took place on 18 November 2019, Kazakhstan was drawn to perform tenth on 24 November 2019, following Wales and preceding Poland.

Voting

Detailed voting results

References

Junior Eurovision Song Contest
Kazakhstan
2019